Chu Zhengyong (born December 28, 1961, in Fuqing, Zhejiang) is a Chinese sprint canoer who competed in the mid-1980s. At the 1984 Summer Olympics in Los Angeles, he was eliminated in the repechages of the K-2 1000 m event.

References

Sports-Reference.com profile

1961 births
Living people
People from Deqing County, Zhejiang
Sportspeople from Zhejiang
Chinese male canoeists
Olympic canoeists of China
Canoeists at the 1984 Summer Olympics